Zavrag is a rural locality (a village) in Tiginskoye Rural Settlement, Vozhegodsky District, Vologda Oblast, Russia. The population was 43 as of 2002.

Geography 
Zavrag is located 51 km northwest of Vozhega (the district's administrative centre) by road. Korotkovskaya is the nearest rural locality.

References 

Rural localities in Vozhegodsky District